Virgin Prunes were an Irish rock band formed in 1977 in Dublin, Ireland. They disbanded in 1986 after the departure of singer Gavin Friday. The other members continued under the name The Prunes until they split up in 1991.

History
The Virgin Prunes were founded by members of Lypton Village, a "youthful gang" in Ireland created by Guggi (né Derek Rowen), Gavin Friday (né Fionan Hanvey), and Bono (né Paul Hewson) in the early 1970s. Known for their outrageous and controversial stage performances, led by theatrical singer/songwriter Friday, the band began playing small shows in Dublin, gaining them a cult audience.

Friday and fellow vocalist Guggi, along with third vocalist Dave-iD Busaras, guitarist Dik Evans (brother of U2's The Edge), bassist Strongman (Trevor Rowen, brother of Guggi) and drummer Pod (Anthony Murphy), completed the original lineup. Pod left the group and was replaced by Haa-Lacka Binttii (né Daniel Figgis). With Binttii on drums, tape loops and keyboards, the band secured a deal with Rough Trade Records. They released their first single, "Twenty Tens" on their own Baby Records label (distributed by Rough Trade) on 8 January 1981, followed by a second single, "Moments and Mine (Despite Straight Lines)", on 27 June 1981.

Two other tracks recorded with Binttii were released during 1981 before conflicts with other members forced him out of the band. "Red Nettle" was included on NME compilation C81 and "Third Secret" appeared on Cherry Red compilation Perspectives and Distortion. Work had already started on the "A New Form of Beauty" project while Bintti was with the band, but after he was replaced by Mary D'Nellon (né David Kelly) on drums, some of his tracks were rerecorded and his name was not included in the credits. He later formed the project Princess Tinymeat.

"A New Form of Beauty" was a project that originally contained four chapters and was released in various formats: a 7" single, 10" single and 12" EP released in 1981, and a cassette issued in 1982. All four parts were later collected as the A New Form of Beauty Parts 1-4 compilation album. The project also included two additional pieces, the unpublished book A New Form of Beauty 6 and the unreleased film A New Form of Beauty 7.

In November 1982, the Virgin Prunes released their debut studio album, ...If I Die, I Die (produced by Colin Newman of Wire), as well as the double 10" EP Hérésie, a French box set. Commissioned by Yann Farcy after seeing them perform at the Rex Club in Paris, Hérésie was based on a loose examination of insanity. In 1984, both Guggi and Dik Evans, unhappy with the music business, left the band. This forced drummer D'Nellon to switch to guitar and allowed Pod to return as the band's drummer. The Virgin Prunes started to record but abandoned the unreleased album Sons Find Devils.

A retrospective video titled Sons Find Devils - A Live Retrospective 1981-1983 was released in 1986 by Ikon; this video had nothing to do with the unreleased album of the same name. In April 1985, rarities compilation Over the Rainbow was released.

In July 1986, the band, now a four-piece, finally released a second studio album, The Moon Looked Down and Laughed (including recordings of music written for Sons Find Devils). Later that year, Friday left the group. His departure was confirmed in the liner notes of the band's 1987 live album The Hidden Lie, which contained a short statement confirming the band's breakup.

After disbanding as Virgin Prunes, D'Nellon, Strongman and Busaras formed an offshoot group called The Prunes, which released three albums between 1988 and 1991 (1988's Lite Fantastik, 1989's Nada, and 1991's Blossoms & Blood ). Dik Evans played on ”Lite Fantastik" while 17-year-old Justin Kavanagh (aka Valley Limberg) from the Dublin hardcore band Mutant Asylumtook the helm as guitarist for "Blossoms & Blood". In 1993, Kavanagh went on to form Gormenghast and Snifferdog with Ger Griffin. Binttii's youngest brother, Jonathan Figgis, was the boy who appeared on the cover of the second Virgin Prunes single, "Moments and Mine".

In 1998, Cleopatra Records rereleased the Sons Find Devils video, along with a soundtrack album on CD. This was the first commercially available Virgin Prunes material to be released since 1993 and, for a few years, the only commercially available full-length Virgin Prunes album on compact disc (though studio recordings of the songs "Baby Turns Blue", "Pagan Lovesong" and "Caucasian Walk" had cropped up on various goth and post-punk CD compilations).
 
Friday went on to have a reasonably successful solo career in both music and film, releasing five solo albums and several scores, while Guggi remained an influential artist in Dublin and Busaras continued to record as a solo artist in Ireland. After 20 years of self-imposed seclusion from the rock world, Dik Evans gave an overview of he and his brother The Edge's early years in U2 for the December 2005 issue of Word Magazine.

Daniel Figgis later became a composer and multimedia producer and curator, becoming composer in residence with Dun Laoghaire/Rathdown, Dublin. One of his compositions, "Post Production", a 23-section suite for four musicians, was performed at the Winter Garden Theatre in New York City in December 2006. In 2008, the Arts>World financial centre commissioned Figgis to compose and perform the sole European commission to celebrate their 20th anniversary of arts programming. His multi-disciplinary festival, "Snakes & Ladders", appeared on Broadway on 8 January 2010 at Symphony Space.

The Virgin Prunes discography was remastered and reissued on Mute Records in 2004. The set of reissues included ...If I Die, I Die, The Moon Looked Down and Laughed, Over the Rainbow, Hérésie and an album of selections from the A New Form of Beauty series. In 2006, Busaras, Guggi and Friday contributed a track to the sea shanty collection Rogue's Gallery, appearing in the track listing as Three Pruned Men.

On 4 October 2009, three original members of the band (Friday, Guggi and Dik Evans) performed two classic Virgin Prunes songs, "Sweethome Under White Clouds" and "Caucasian Walk", at Carnegie Hall as part of "An Evening with Gavin Friday and Friends", to celebrate Friday's 50th birthday. J.G. Thirlwell appeared with them as backing vocalist.

Discography

Albums

Studio albums

Live albums

Compilation albums

Video albums

EPs

Singles

Selected compilation appearances
 "Red Nettle" on C81 (1981, Rough Trade/NME)
 "Third Secret" on Perspectives and Distortion (1981, Cherry Red)
 "Jigsaw Mentallama" on Vinyl Magazine #9 flexi disc (1981, Vinyl Magazine)
 "Mad Bird in the Wood" on Dokument: Ten Highlights in the History of Popular Music 1981>1982 (1982, Roadrunner)

Literature 
 Rolf Vasellari: The Faculties of a Broken Heart (1985, Black Sheep Press)

References

External links
 
 Gavin Friday, official website
 Guggi's official website
 Dave-iD.com
 Daniel Figgis' official website
 Mute Records website
 Peter Rowen official site

 
Irish gothic rock groups
Irish punk rock groups
Musical groups from Dublin (city)
Irish post-punk music groups
Musical groups established in 1977
Musical groups disestablished in 1986
Mute Records artists
Touch and Go Records artists